This is a list of flag bearers who have represented Chile at the Olympics.

Flag bearers carry the national flag of their country at the opening ceremony of the Olympic Games.

See also
Chile at the Olympics

References

Chile at the Olympics
Chile
Olympics